Shamim Karhani (8 June 1913 - 19 March 1975) was an eminent Urdu poet ('Shayar') of the 20th century.

Early life, education and employment

Shamim Karhani was born in a 'Zamindar' family to Syed Muhammad Akhtar and Ummat ul Zehra on 8 June 1913 in village 'Karhan' district Mau, UP in India. His real name was 'Syed Shamsuddin Haider'. He himself chose 'Shamim Karhani' as his pen name ('Takhallus'). Later, this pen name of his became so famous that once, at an interview, when he was asked his name, he himself had to pause for a moment to remember his real name! He did his secondary education from Aligarh Muslim University and also did 'Maulvi Kamil Munshi'. For his profession, he chose to be a teacher. He worked with Dayanand Anglo-Vedic Schools System, Kaumi Awaz and Anglo Arabic School (New Delhi). He was a scholar of the Persian language; however he did all his poetry in Urdu.

Poetry and India's freedom struggle

Shamim had a taste in poetry since he was a kid.  He composed his first couplet at the age of eight. He now was aware what he was born for.  He started writing and was adored all over Uttar Pradesh. This was the era when India was vehemently trying to get out of snare of British rule. Being an Indian he started writing poems that conveyed the moral of adhesion to one's own country. These poems became so influential that his popular revolutionary 'Nazms' and 'Naghmas' ('Geets') were sung in the 'Prabhat-Pheris' taken out on the streets of cities like Lucknow and Varanasi during the freedom struggle.

Soon Shamim Karhani's nationalist and revolutionary poetry started attracting the attention of both the common people and the literati. It was through this nationalist platform that he joined the Progressive Writers' Movement. In 1948 he composed a poem entitled Jagao Na Bapu Ko Neend Aa Gayi Hai just after the assassination of Mahatma Gandhi. The above poem had such an emotional appeal that it spread like the jungle fire. Once, Shamim Karhani had the opportunity to recite the poem in the presence of Pandit Jawaharlal Nehru, the first Prime Minister of India. Nehru, after listening to the poem, got impressed by Shamim's work and asked him to come to Lucknow to recite his poems in Congress election meetings. Later, after independence, Nehru asked Shamim to come to Delhi. He migrated to Delhi in 1950 and met Nehru at 'Teen-Murti'. Nehru asked him to compose an epic in Urdu on the freedom movement of India and started giving him a stipend for the job from his personal pocket. On 7 February 1950 he wrote in Shamim's diary:

His collection entitled "Roshan Andhera" was entirely devoted to the "Quit India Movement".

Shamim Karhani was a contemporary of eminent poets like Faiz Ahmed 'Faiz', Ali 'Sardar' Jafri, 'Majaz Lucknawi', Moin Ahsan 'Jazbi', Ali 'Jawad' Zaidi, etc. Being basically a 'Ghazal-go' (one who composes 'Ghazals'), however, tried his hand on each and every 'genre' of Urdu 
poetry and some of his compositions found eternal place in Urdu literature. He has composed (apart from ghazals) poems, 'rubaees', 'qataat', 'geet', elegies, 'marsiyas', 'eulogies' etc.

List of works

Burq-o-Baaran (1939)
Roshan Andhera (1942)
Taraaney (1944)
Badh Chal Re Hindustan (1948)
Tameer (1948)
Aks-i-Gul (1962)
Intekhaab-i-Kalaam-i-Shamim Karhani (1963)
Zulfiqaar (1964)
Harf-i-Neem Shab (1972)
Jaan-i-Baraadar (1973)
Subh-i-Faaran (1974)
Main Bootarabi (1974)
Kileed-i-Insha
Pushp Chhaya (Hindi translation of Aks-i-Gul)

Awards

Award from the government of Uttar Pradesh (India) for his collection 'Aks-i-Gul' in 1964
Award from Uttar Pradesh (India) Urdu Academy for his collection ‘Harf-i-Neem Shab’ in 1972<ref
name="Karhani, Abid 1986"/>
Saroop Narayan Urdu Nazm Award in 1972
Award from Government of India for his collection ‘Ranga Ke Geet’

Notes

References
 Ali Anjum, Syed Khwaja: Shamim Karhani: Hayaat, Shaksiyat aur Shayari, Syed Sikandar Ali & co., 1986
 Gujral, I.K.: P.I.B. Press Release (Government of India), Ministry of Information and Broadcasting, 1975
 Karhani, Abid: “Aajkal Urdu (New Delhi)”, Publications Division, Ministry of Information and Broadcasting, Government Of India, 1986
 Lall, Inder Jit, Shamim: Poet-Patriot, The Sunday Standard, 10, December 1972
 Lall, Inder Jit, Shamim: the Poet Whose Life Itself is a Poem, Patriot Magazine, 6, May 1973

1913 births
1975 deaths
20th-century Indian poets
Indian male poets
Poets from Uttar Pradesh
People from Mau district
20th-century Indian male writers